Elifli railway station is a station near the village of Elifli in the Torbalı district of the İzmir Province. Consisting of a single side platform, 14 daily trains operated by TCDD Taşımacılık stop at the station.

References

Railway stations in İzmir Province
Railway stations opened in 1883
1883 establishments in the Ottoman Empire
Bayındır District